In Motion is an album by the David Becker Tribune released in 1991.

Track listing
All writing by David Becker except where indicated

 "Wesward Ho"
 "Intro"
 "In Motion"
 "Outta Towner"
 "Forgotten Friends"
 "Time Has Fun (When Your Flying By)" (David Becker, Tom Lilly)
 "Pepe"
 "From the Right Side"
 "Cobalt Blue (David Becker, Bruce Becker)
 "Passion Dance" (McCoy Tyner)
 "Just Because"

Personnel
 David Becker – acoustic electric guitars, keyboards
 T Lavitz – piano
 Tom Lilly – fretless bass, keyboards
 Bruce Becker – drums, percussion
 Brad Dutz – percussion

References

1991 albums